The Joe R. and Teresa Lozano Long School of Medicine is one of twelve medical schools in the state of Texas. It is located on the main campus of University of Texas Health Science Center at San Antonio in San Antonio, Texas.

Budget
The school's budget in 2009 was $415 million.

Rankings
 U.S. News & World Report ranked the school 42nd nationally in primary care in 2010.
 University ranked 6th in the nation in clinical medicine research impact for the period 2001 to 2005.
 Ranked 51st in the world in the 2010 clinical medicine rankings.
 1st for Hispanics in the medical school category.
 1st in National Institutes of Health funding for aging research.
 Ranked 48th in NIH funding for research grants among 3,181 institutes in 2004.
 10th in NIH funding for Cellular and Structural Biology.
 17th in NIH funding for Physiology.

University hospital
The school's main teaching hospital is the University Health System, and was ranked among the top 50 hospitals in the U.S. in kidney disorders in 2010.

Departments

The departments are:
 Anesthesiology
 Cardiothoracic Surgery
 Emergency Medicine
 Epidemiology and Biostatistics
 Family & Community Medicine
 Medicine
 Neurology
 Neurosurgery
 Obstetrics and Gynecology
 Ophthalmology
 Orthopaedics
 Otolaryngology
 Pediatrics
 Psychiatry
 Radiation Oncology
 Radiology
 Rehabilitation Medicine
 Surgery
 Urology

References

External links
 The official website of the Medical School at UTHSCSA

University of Texas Health Science Center at San Antonio
Educational institutions established in 1970
San Antonio